Naveed Aamir Jeeva is a Pakistani Christian politician of Pakistan Peoples Party- PPP, who has been a member of the National Assembly of Pakistan since August 2018 and Ex Member of the Provincial Assembly of Punjab in 2002.

Early life
Naveed Aamir was born in a Christian Village of District Sahiwal Chak No. 148/9.L Ranson Abad on 22 September 1975.

Family
He is the Elder son of S. L Saleem, a government teacher, and his wife Mrs Agnis Saleem, a nurse. He has three younger sisters and one younger brother, Shakeel Jeeva. Naveed Aamir Jeeva is settled in Multan in southern Punjab, his paternal and maternal families are settled in both Sahiwal and Multan.

Qualification
Master's degree in International Relations from Bahauddin Zakariya University, Multan
B.ed from the University of Education
B.A from Bahauddin Zakariya University, Multan
Fsc from Emerson University, Multan
Matriculation from Government Muslim Boys High School, Multan

Political career
He was elected to the National Assembly- MNA of Pakistan as a candidate of Pakistan Peoples Party on a reserved seat for minorities in the 2018 Pakistani general election. He was elected as a Member of the Provincial Assembly in 2002 in Pervaiz Musharraf's Government on Minorities reserved seat from Pakistan Peoples Party.

Naveed Aamir started his struggle against religious discrimination in society from a very early age. His first successful protest against the school administration for a separate prayer period for non-Muslim / Christian students in the morning assembly proved to be the first step of his political struggle.

Naveed is one of the closest friends of Martyr Shahbaz Bhatti and Loyal worker of APMA (All Pakistan Minorities Alliance) and CLF (Christian Liberation Front-Pak). He never stopped his political struggle after the assassination of Shahbaz Bhatti. He continued his struggle with patience and courage, and never changed his loyalty and political affiliation with Pakistan Peoples Party. He is representing religious minorities now in the legislative/national assembly of Pakistan.

References

Living people
Pakistani Christians
Pakistani MNAs 2018–2023
Pakistan People's Party MNAs
1974 births